Nanjing salted duck is a local duck dish from Nanjing, China. The history of the dish goes back hundreds of years, possibly to the 14th century, but it grew more famous during the Qing Dynasty. The tender white duck-meat has some fat but is not greasy, and in presentation the dish is fragrant and often crispy. Although available all year round, experts believe that duck in autumn inherently possesses a sweet scent of osmanthus and is therefore best in this season. In line with this statement, some cooked-meat product shops have started experimenting with the use of osmanthus to flavour duck. Nanjing salted duck prepared shortly before or after mid-Autumn is reputed to taste the best, because of duck production during the sweet osmanthus blooming season (osmanthus may be added to the spice mixture particularly in those months). Sometimes the seasonal version of the dish is called "osmanthus duck".

Nanjing salted duck is often regarded as a dish to share. As a popular pastime, whether locals on family holidays or simply daily visitors, people in Nanjing often take to the streets to buy Nanjing salted duck. Nanjing is a culinary centre noted for its Jinling dishes, especially quality ducks and a whole variety of duck dishes. Over 100 million ducks per year are eaten in the city of 8 million.

Nanjing salted duck reigns supreme on the table in southern China, just as Peking duck reigns supreme in northern China. For the people of Nanjing, eating salted duck once a day seems to have become a regular habit. Some historians believe that the ducks were first raised as livestock by the Nanjing people more than two thousand years ago. The Nanjing salted duck is recorded as a gourmet entry in the List of Jinling’s Delicacies by the modern Chinese gourmet Tongzhi Zhang. Most of Nanjing's most famous duck shops are located around the Shuiximen area. The key to the formation of the unique flavour of Nanjing salted duck is the oxidation and degradation of the duck fat, which is achieved throughout the production process through a series of steps including dry-curing, salting, roasting and boiling. In parts of China, taro and salted duck are a unique combination. Over the years, Nanjing salted duck has achieved a number of honourable achievements in different fields.

Place of origin 
Cooked duck products are widely popular in China for their rich nutritional value as much as for their flavour, and are especially so in Nanjing. This ancient city on the southern bank of the Yangtze River has a long history of duck farming, with some historians even suggesting that ducks were raised as livestock in the old city of Nanjing more than 2,000 years ago. In the early Ming Dynasty (1368-1644), the salted duck was an essential part of many Nanjing families’ daily meals, and even the emperor of the time, Zhu Yuanzhang, was fond of it.

For the people of Nanjing, enjoying salted duck with the meal every day is as commonplace as drinking a cold drink on a hot summer day or a warm congee on a cold winter day. The people of Nanjing love eating duck to such an extent that it is a sin not to eat it once a day, so it has become a regular habit in Nanjing for rich and poor alike to have a plate of salted duck, whether in the company of others or alone. Every summer evening, there will always be two or three old men sitting together on the streets of Nanjing, drinking alcohol with two wings and two legs of salted duck as a side dish.

Origin, according to tradition 
One legend holds that when Zhu Yuanzhang was the emperor (with Nanjing as the capital in the 14th century), there was a dispute of sorts, and an edict was issued to kill all the roosters in the city. This solved a noise problem, but the result was no chicken to eat. The people of Nanjing had to eat duck instead, which gave rise to the prominence in Nanjing of duck dishes like Nanjing salted duck. Other accounts claim that Nanjing was famed for duck dishes centuries earlier, dating even to the Southern Dynasties (420~589 A.D.).

During the Qing Dynasty (1644-1911), near the Fuzimiao, the examination venue for the imperial examinations, major restaurants and teahouses specialised in preparing brine duck to satisfy the taste buds of students.

Gastronomical records 
The gourmet entry for Nanjing salted duck was recorded in Tongzhi Zhang's List of Jinling’s Delicacies published in February 1947, one of the 61 entries in his selection. These 61 gourmet entries cover a wide range of local delicacies that Tongzhi Zhang has tasted in Nanjing during his lifetime, including but not limited to raw materials, processed foods and cooked dishes.

Tongzhi Zhang (1875-1948), who came from the present Luhe district of Nanjing, was not only a highly respected scholar, educator, poet, calligrapher and painter in contemporary China, but also a gourmet. The fall of the Qing dynasty in 1911 forced Tongzhi Zhang to leave officialdom for Nanjing, where he spent the rest of his life. List of Jinling’s Delicacies is included in Nanjing wenxian (Nanjing documents), then edited by Tongzhi Zhang himself, as a food review that is a testament to his ability to console himself by sampling the local cuisine of Nanjing. In addition to Nanjing salted duck, many of the 61 gourmet entries recorded by Tongzhi Zhang are still representative of Nanjing's local specialties these days.

According to Tongzhi Zhang's comments, for the meat of the Nanjing salted duck to be fatty enough, the ducks used for cooking must be carefully reared, with particular attention to the feed fed to the ducks. The distinctive flavour, perfect tenderness and moderate saltiness of Nanjing salted duck are all due to the right amount of time and salt used in the curing process. This is also due to the moist heat cooking technique used in the production of Nanjing salted duck, which makes the duck meat to be fleshy and firm and full of juices. It is therefore crucial to control the temperature during the cooking process of the duck, otherwise neither the aroma nor the taste of the duck meat will reach the standard value, and it may even be said to be irrelevant to the quality of authentic Nanjing salted duck. Finally, Tongzhi Zhang also mentions the reputation and popularity of the salted duck produced and sold by Hanfuxing Shop in Nanjing because of its rich and attractive aroma and fatty but not greasy taste.

Cooking method

The duck, with wings and feet removed, is cleaned and drained. Spices and recipes vary, but a simple approach is to rub pepper into the body with more stuffed inside. The duck is cooked in a pot, pickled (1–2 hours in summer, 4 hours in winter), and hung to dry in a well ventilated area. The duck is then simmered in water with ginger, onion, and star anise. Finally, the duck is cut into strips.

Salted duck at Shuiximen 
Most of the most famous duck shops in Nanjing are located in the Shuiximen area, and if a duck shop has "Shuiximen" in its name, then the shop is doing a lot of business which will be more than expected. Some of the better known of these shops have been Shuiximen Xu's Duck, Shuiximen Yin's Duck, Shuiximen Cheng's Duck, Shuiximen Lu's Duck, and not only them, but all the duck shops around Shuiximen advertise and claim that they make and sell the most authentic Nanjing Shuiximen salted duck. Salted duck shops in Nanjing tend to do their best business in the afternoon, with a long queue of customers usually forming in front of the shop by 3 pm each day. Each day when the shop opens for business, one of the owners or staff is responsible for cutting the prepared salted duck and the other for serving the customers. The vast majority of salted duck shops are snapped up by around 6 pm each day.

When preparing the salted duck, it is necessary to go through the brining step. Unlike ordinary businesses, some specialists or shops serving authentic Nanjing salted duck do not wear rubber gloves to handle the duck during this step. This is because the gloves block the touch of the fingers and thus do not ensure that the salt particles are evenly dispersed on the surface of the duck's skin, or even in more serious cases leave a rubbery taste in the meat. In addition, as the meat of authentic Nanjing salted duck is very tender and tasty and easy to get stale, the flavour of the duck itself can be contaminated if plastic pots are used in the brining step.

It is because there are indeed many different ways to cook duck that, with the exception of the main product, salted duck, all companies and shops in Nanjing that produce and sell cooked duck products, regardless of size, are struggling to find their niche markets. From large banquets to small alleyway stalls, a duck is found mutilated into different parts for different cooking methods such as curing, drying, roasting, smoking and stewing.

Flavour and production techniques 

Among the many traditional meat products in China, Nanjing salted duck is one of the few processed meat products cooked at low temperatures. As a famous local appetiser, Nanjing salted duck is well known for its tender and flavourful taste and meticulous processing. Although Nanjing salted duck may appear to be an ordinary dish at first glance, its unique and rich flavour has made it a cornerstone of Jinling cuisine, thus not only rivalling Peking duck in terms of taste, but also enjoying similar popularity and reputation as Peking duck. Jinling cuisine is the ancient Chinese name for Nanjing cuisine, which is subordinate to Jiangsu cuisine, one of the eight major cuisines of China, and can be traced back to the Six Dynasties (222-589 A.D.).

Cooked duck products are a popular food not only in China, but all over the world, and Nanjing salted duck is one of the most well-known ones. Nanjing salted duck is cooked in the traditional Chinese brine method at low temperatures, and its tender and flavourful taste has made it a world-famous local specialty. In China, brine is recognised as a means of treating raw meat with only a bloody smell, and it is widely used in the preparation of various cooked meat products with traditional characteristics. As a traditional cured meat cooked with this technique, the flavour is the most important sensory quality and characteristic of Nanjing salted duck. Due to the high unsaturated fatty acid content of the duck, the oxidation and degradation of the fat are essential for the formation of the perfect taste of the duck meat, which is also the key to Nanjing salted duck's unique flavour. The production process involves a series of steps such as dry-curing, salting, roasting and boiling, all of which are essential, as they together contribute to the oxidation and degradation of the fat. When the products of fat degradation are increased, the typical and distinctive flavour of Nanjing salted duck is created and enhanced.

The dry-curing process makes an important contribution to the degradation of duck fat by accelerating its oxidation to a great extent throughout the production process of Nanjing salted duck. During the curing process, it is better if the whole duck is completely immersed in the aged brine, which is the salting step, and this is why other categories of cooked duck products never reach the flavour and quality standards of the Nanjing salted duck. The optimum ageing time for duck is 24 hours, which is more conducive to the processing and subsequent flavour formation of the salted duck and is also more suitable for real-life production. The ageing step often follows the brining (salting) and is somewhat similar to the processing of ham. As the ageing time increases, the water content of the duck meat decreases, so the dehydration caused by excessive ageing time can seriously affect the water locking capacity of the duck meat, which is detrimental to the oxidation of fat and thus hinders the formation and development of the flavour of Nanjing salted duck.

To summarise the whole process, in the dry-curing step, the salt inhibits the formation of bitterness, which contributes to the mellow taste and flavour of Nanjing salted duck; in the brining step, the taste and flavour of the duck are greatly enhanced after brine stewing; in the ageing step, the rapid reduction of fat in the duck makes the meat firmer; and the final boiling step further enhances the tender and tasty taste of the duck meat.

Special recipes 
The fame of Nanjing salted duck has long been known to have profoundly influenced many surrounding cities near Nanjing and has successfully made its way to the tables of people in Shanghai and Hangzhou. Just as mashed potatoes and turkey are the signature pairing for Thanksgiving dinner in the United States, taro and duck are the perfect combination for the Mid-Autumn Festival meal in Shanghai, China. The number of recipes developed by chefs in China using taro and duck, both in professional and private kitchens, is innumerable. In the Yangtze River Delta region of eastern China, it is a common practice to cut up peeled taro, stir-fry it with salt and spring onions, and then cook it in a pot with duck bought from a nearby delicatessen. In this case, the Nanjing salted duck, with its rich and attractive aroma and fatty but not greasy taste, is always one of the most popular choices. In Guangdong province of southern China, the soup-loving Cantonese people choose to put taro and duck together in a slow-cooked soup over low heat, which according to the principles and claims of traditional Chinese medical science, can soothe the dryness that people feel in the body during autumn.

Honorary achievements 

 In 2012, Nanjing salted duck was listed as a Chinese geographical indication agricultural product.
 In 2014, Modern Express, a local newspaper in Nanjing, launched a campaign in which Nanjing salted duck was named as one of the eight most popular dishes in Nanjing.
 In 2014, during the Youth Olympic Games held in Nanjing, Nanjing salted duck was included in the athletes' diet menu, thus giving athletes from all over the world the opportunity to taste this very representative Jiangsu specialty.

See also

 List of duck dishes

References

Additional sources
 南京盐水鸭_网易新闻中心
 南京盐水鸭_旅游新闻_大楚网_腾讯网
 南京盐水鸭_互动百科

Chinese cuisine
Duck dishes